Rosebud is an unincorporated community located in Wilcox County, Alabama, United States.

References

Unincorporated communities in Wilcox County, Alabama
Unincorporated communities in Alabama